Dopfer is a German surname. Notable people with the name include:
 Fritz Dopfer (1987), German former World Cup alpine ski racer
 Kurt Dopfer, Austrian-born Swiss economist
 Sandra Dopfer (1970), former Austrian tennis player

Bavarian language surnames
Surnames of Austrian origin